Eugène-Charles-Jean Godecharle (bapt. 15 January 1742 – 26 June 1798) was a Belgian violinist and composer.

Family
Godecharle was born in Brussels in 1742. His father, Jacques-Antoine Godecharle, was master of music in the church of St Nicholas, and bass singer at the court chapel of Prince Charles of Lorraine, governor of the Austrian Netherlands. Eugène's brother Lambert-François was also a musician, replacing his father as master of music at St Nicholas; another brother was the sculptor Gilles-Lambert Godecharle.

Career

Eugène began in the Prince's choir: his father, noting his talent as a violinist, sent him to Paris for lessons.

On his return to Brussels, he played viola in the chapel from 1773. On the death of Henri-Jacques de Croes, master of the court chapel, in 1786, Godecharle applied to replace him but failed; he became lead violin only in 1788.

Compositions
Godecharle's publications include:
 Sonatas for violin with basso continuo, op. 1
 Symphonie nocturne for strings, two oboes, two horns, piccolo and drum
 Six symphonies, for strings, two oboes and two horns
 Three sonatas for harp with violin accompaniment
 Three sonatas for piano with violin accompaniment, op. 5

He left in manuscript much church music.

References

External links
 
 Eugène Godecharle, Requiem Survey.

1742 births
1798 deaths
Belgian classical violinists
18th-century violinists
Belgian male classical composers
18th-century classical composers
18th-century male musicians
18th-century musicians
Musicians from Brussels
Male classical violinists